RAAF Base Learmonth, also known as Learmonth Airport , is a joint use Royal Australian Air Force base and civil airport. It is located near the town of Exmouth on the north-west coast of Western Australia. RAAF Base Learmonth is one of the RAAF's three bare bases. No RAAF units are currently based at Learmonth and it is maintained by a small caretaker staff during peacetime.

History
During World War II a little-known landing field was constructed on the western shore of Exmouth Gulf. It was code-named "Potshot" and maintained by No. 76 Operational Base Unit, in support of Operation Potshot. In the 1950s the landing field was further developed as a military base and named RAAF Learmonth in honour of Wing Commander Charles Learmonth DFC and Bar, who, while leading No. 14 Squadron, was killed in a flying accident off Rottnest Island, Western Australia on 6 January 1944.

Starting in June 1944, Qantas used Learmonth as an intermediate stop for two converted Consolidated Liberator bombers that flew a segment of the vital England–Australia air route, supplementing modified Consolidated PBY Catalinas flying The Double Sunrise route to Ceylon. The route was named Kangaroo Service and marked the first time that Qantas's now-famous kangaroo logo was used; passengers received a certificate proclaiming them as members of The Order of the Longest Hop. Qantas would again use the base, much later, during the emergency landing of Qantas Flight 72.

In the mid-1960s, the Federal Government gave its support to plans by the Chief of the Air Staff, Air Marshal Val Hancock, to redevelop Learmonth as a bare base, due to its proximity to Indonesia. Though F-111Cs could have made a round-trip to Indonesia's capital, Jakarta, from RAAF Base Darwin, the route they took would have been very much limited by range. Learmonth's relative proximity added flexibility to the routes in and out, enhancing the likelihood of a successful strike. The major work was undertaken by No. 5 Airfield Construction Squadron between 1971 and 1973.

See also
 List of airports in Western Australia
 List of Royal Australian Air Force installations

References

External links
 RAAF Base Learmonth at airforce.gov.au
 Learmonth at RAAF Museum
 

Royal Australian Air Force bases
Airports in Western Australia
Shire of Exmouth
Military installations in Western Australia
Military installations established in the 1950s
1950s establishments in Australia
Commonwealth Heritage List places in Western Australia